The Conspirators (or Give Me This Woman)  is a 1944 American film noir, World War II, drama, spy, and thriller film directed by Jean Negulesco. It stars Hedy Lamarr and Paul Henreid, features Sydney Greenstreet and Peter Lorre in supporting roles, and has a cameo of Aurora Miranda singing a Fado. The Conspirators reunites several performers who appeared in Casablanca (1942).

Plot
During World War II, a schoolteacher, Vincent Van Der Lyn (Paul Henreid), who becomes a Dutch resistance fighter, causes so much trouble for the Nazis that they place a bounty on his head. As a result, he is ordered by his superiors to travel to England via neutral Lisbon.

On Van Der Lyn's arrival, Police Captain Pereira (Joseph Calleia) notes that his passport has no exit stamp on it, indicating that he sneaked across the border, but reassures the traveler that all that matters is that the Portuguese visa is in order. The German agent Otto Lutzke (Kurt Katch) becomes suspicious, informs his superiors and starts tailing the Dutchman.

At a restaurant, Van Der Lyn is pleasantly surprised when a beautiful stranger, Irene Von Mohr (Hedy Lamarr), sits down at his table. Moments before, Irene had passed a card to a man in a nearby alley, only to see him shot in the back. She flees into the restaurant, but as the police arrive to search the place, she quickly sits down at Van Der Lyn's table to throw off suspicion. She describes herself to him as merely a frequent gambler at the Casino Estoril. She excuses herself, supposedly to make a telephone call, but never returns. The Dutchman goes to the aforementioned casino where he finds Irene. As she warns him to stay away from her, they are joined by Hugo Von Mohr (Victor Francen), who is a high-ranking German diplomatic official, and Lutzke. The Germans soon identify Van Der Lyn as the saboteur nicknamed the "Flying Dutchman."

Van Der Lyn meets his contact, Ricardo Quintanilla (Sydney Greenstreet), who introduces him to other members of his resistance group: the Pole Jan Bernazsky (Peter Lorre), the Norwegian Anton Wynat (an uncredited Gregory Gaye), and the Frenchman Paulo Leiris. Quintanilla asks him to brief Jennings (an uncredited Monte Blue), Van Der Lyn's replacement. In private, Quintanilla warns the newcomer that he suspects one of their group to be a traitor.

The next day, when Irene gets into her automobile, Van Der Lyn invites himself along for the ride. At first annoyed, she gradually warms to him, and they spend the day together. He professes that he is in love with her. She tells him that she married Hugo after he rescued her from Dachau concentration camp.

When Van Der Lyn returns to his hotel room, he finds Jennings slumped over the desk. Jennings is able to give him a message regarding an "eagle" before he dies. Acting on a false tip, the police arrest him for the murder of Jennings. A distraught Irene tells Captain Pereira that the Dutchman was with her all that day but declines to testify in court. When she visits Van Der Lyn in jail, he accuses her of framing him.

Van Der Lyn jumps a guard and manages to escape. Irene finds him and offers to take him to Quintanilla. She reveals that she is a resistance fighter as well. His suspicions towards Irene are softened after she gives him a gun. When they reach Quintanilla and the others, they charge him with being a traitor. Van Der Lyn himself concedes that they would be foolish if they did not kill him. However, when he mentions Jennings's dying message to Quintanilla, which warns that his killers have taken the "eagle," a rare coin that was to have been used to identify him, and something that Van Der Lyn had not been told, they know he must be telling the truth. Hugo is then revealed to be part of the underground group.

Quintanilla decides to set a trap by informing the group that Jennings's replacement is in the casino hotel since he knows that the Germans will move to eliminate him to plant their own agent successfully. Pereira spots Van Der Lyn but is persuaded to trust him and wait a few minutes for the real murderer to be revealed. Fifteen minutes before the resistance group members are to meet the new man, when they are gathered at a roulette table along with known Nazi agents, Quintanilla tells all in the group the new man's room number, 865. With time running out, Hugo places bets on 8, 6, and 5, revealing that he is the traitor. Quintanilla and the others escort him away, but he manages to escape from them fleeing the casino, where he is killed in a shootout with Van Der Lyn and Captain Pereira who have been pursuing him. Van Der Lyn finds the eagle in one of Hugo's pockets.

Vincent Van Der Lyn decides to return to occupied Europe in Jennings's place. Irene promises to wait to learn of his safe passage across the border, and Vincent promises to come back to her.

Cast

 Hedy Lamarr as Irene Von Mohr
 Paul Henreid as Vincent Van Der Lyn
 Sydney Greenstreet as Ricardo Quintanilla
 Peter Lorre as Jan Bernazsky
 Victor Francen as Hugo Von Mohr
 Joseph Calleia as Police Captain Pereira

 Carol Thurston as Rosa, Miguel's daughter
 Vladimir Sokoloff as Miguel, a Portuguese fisherman who helps Van Der Lyn
 Edward Ciannelli as Police Colonel Almeida, Pereira's superior
 Steven Geray as Dr. Schmitt
 Kurt Katch as Otto Lutzke

Note: Character names are not indicated in on-screen credits.

Production
Production on The Conspirators ran from late April to mid-May 1944. The film's working title was Give Me This Woman. In pre-production, a number of actors were considered for roles in The Conspirators, including Joan Fontaine, Helmut Dantine, Humphrey Bogart, and Ann Sheridan, before Hedy Lamarr was borrowed from MGM for the film to star in the lead female role. Hal B. Wallis had asked Ayn Rand to help rewrite the love scenes in this film for the director, Jean Negulesco; apparently, only a few of Rand's lines were retained in the film, and she is uncredited as having contributed anything to the script. See a review by David Hayes.

Reception
Bosley Crowther, a film critic for The New York Times, called The Conspirators "a disappointing show. And, indeed, it would be quite as vexing if it came from a less able lot." Savaged by critics, The Conspirators was then reviewed by Frederic Prokosch, the author of the novel on which the film was based, who wrote a brusque critique of it in The New Republic.

See also
List of American films of 1944

References

Additional sources 
 Behlmer, Rudy, ed. Inside Warner Bros (1935-1951). Cambridge, Ontario, Canada: Fireside, 1987. .

External links

 
 
 
 

1944 films
1944 romantic drama films
1940s spy films
American romantic drama films
American spy drama films
1940s English-language films
American black-and-white films
Films based on American novels
Films set in Lisbon
World War II films made in wartime
World War II spy films
Warner Bros. films
Films scored by Max Steiner
Films directed by Jean Negulesco